Constantia (minor planet designation: 315 Constantia) is a stony background asteroid from the inner region of the asteroid belt, approximately  in diameter. It was discovered by Austrian astronomer Johann Palisa at the Vienna Observatory on 4 September 1891. The asteroid is a member of the Flora family.

References

External links 
 
 

000315
Discoveries by Johann Palisa
Named minor planets
18910904